

Wilferth was a medieval Bishop of Lichfield.

Wilferth was consecrated between 889 and 900 and died between 909 and 915.

Citations

References

External links
 (as Bishop of Lichfield)

10th-century English bishops
Anglo-Saxon bishops of Lichfield
9th-century births
10th-century deaths
Year of birth unknown
Year of death unknown